Chandra Mahesh is an Indian film director, producer and actor who works in Telugu cinema.

Filmography 
Below are the selected filmography of Chandra Mahesh.

 1999: Preyasi Raave
 2000: Ayodhya Ramayya
 2001: Cheppalani Vundhi
 2002: Joruga Husharuga
 2005: Okkade 
 2006: Hanumanthu
 2010: Aalasyam Amrutam
 2015: Red Alert

References

External links
 

1968 births
Living people
Telugu film directors
People from East Godavari district